Killion is a surname.

Notable People
Ann Killion (birth date unknown), American sports journalist and writer
David T. Killion (born 1966), American government official and diplomat
John J. Killion (1859-1937), American boxer better known as "Jake Kilrain"
Kyle Killion (born 1984), American football linebacker
Redley A. Killion (born 1951), Micronesian politician
Sarah Killion (born 1992), American professional soccer player
Sean Killion (born 1967), American swimmer
Theophilius "Theo" Killion (birth date unknown), American businessman
Thomas H. Killion (born 1957), American politician
Tom Killion (born 1953), American fine art printmaker and author

See also
Ó Cillín, Celtic family name from which Killion derives
Killian, an alternate spelling